Tobias Winkler (born 16 January 1978) is a German politician for the CSU and since 2021 a member of the Bundestag, the federal diet.

Life and politics
Winkler was born in 1978 in the West German city of Nuremberg and studied politics in Munich.

Winkler became a member of the Bundestag in 2021.

References

Living people
1978 births
Politicians from Nuremberg
Members of the Bundestag for Bavaria
Members of the Bundestag 2021–2025
Members of the Bundestag for the Christian Social Union in Bavaria
21st-century German politicians